is a village located in Kuma District, Kumamoto Prefecture, Japan.

In March 2017 the village had an estimated population of 1,136 and a density of 4.5 persons per km2. The total area is 252.94 km2.

The village is located in the southeast of Kumamoto and the north of the regional center Hitoyoshi. It is very mountainous and most villagers live in narrow valleys eroded by Kawabe River and others.

The name of Itsuki is well known for an indigenous folksong Itsuki no Komoriuta, or Lullaby of Itsuki.

The plan for constructing Kawabe River Dam was accepted by the village after a long dispute among villagers and environmentalists.

Kawabe River Dam
This project has been put on hold by the Japanese government until further notice. Most buildings and houses in the village have been dismantled or demolished and rebuilt on higher ground.

References

External links

Itsuki official website 

Villages in Kumamoto Prefecture